is a Buddhist temple of the Shingon school located in Gifu, Gifu Prefecture, Japan. Though its formal name is Hokke-ji, it is more well known by its unofficial name, Mitahora Kōbō (三田洞弘法).

It is located in the foothills of Mount Dodo, the largest mountain in the city of Gifu. Also, it is the fifteenth of the Mino Thirty-three Kannon.

History
The temple was originally built in 816, by Kūkai under the orders of Emperor Saga. Kūkai's posthumous name was "Kōbō Daishi" (弘法大師), giving rise to the temple's alternate name.

Burnt to the ground by fire in 1620, it was consumed by fire and not rebuilt until 1623. Sixty-one years later, in 1684, it was moved to its current location.

Festivals
February 3 - Setsubun Star Festival
21st of every month - Kōbō Daishi Memorial Service

See also
Mino Thirty-three Kannon
Glossary of Japanese Buddhism

References

Images 

Buildings and structures in Gifu
Buddhist temples in Gifu Prefecture
Kōyasan Shingon temples